Glory Nzingo (born 4 November 2004) is an Irish professional footballer currently playing as a midfielder for Stade de Reims.

Club career
Born in Dublin, Nzingo played for the youth sides of Mountview Boys, Castleknock Celtic, Home Farm and Cherry Orchard, before a move to St Patrick's Athletic in January 2019. He made his debut for St Pat's in a 4–0 pre-season friendly loss to English side Chelsea, at the age of fourteen. In 2020, he was named Football Association of Ireland under-15 player of the year.

In June 2021, French side Stade Rennais launched a bid for Nzingo. However, he went on to join fellow French side Stade de Reims in July of the same year.

International career
Nzingo has represented the Republic of Ireland at youth international level.

Career statistics

Club

Notes

References

2004 births
Living people
Association footballers from Dublin (city)
Republic of Ireland association footballers
Republic of Ireland youth international footballers
Irish people of Democratic Republic of the Congo descent
Association football midfielders
Championnat National 2 players
Home Farm F.C. players
Cherry Orchard F.C. players
St Patrick's Athletic F.C. players
Stade de Reims players
Republic of Ireland expatriate association footballers
Irish expatriate sportspeople in France
Expatriate footballers in France
Black Irish sportspeople